Bernie Alpha Ibini-Isei (born 12 September 1992), also known simply as Bernie Ibini, is a professional soccer player who plays as a winger and a forward. Born in Nigeria, he represented Australia internationally.

Early life
Bernie Ibini-Isei immigrated to Australia from Nigeria when he was a child, and grew up in Sydney's Canterbury-Bankstown region. His passion for soccer was obvious from a very young age, and at the age of six years old he was registered to play for his local club Earlwood Wanderers.

He has a sister, Princess Ibini-Isei, who is also a soccer player, playing for Sydney FC in the W-League and the Australian team.

Club career
Ibini started playing soccer for New South Wales Premier League club Blacktown City at youth level. He was immediately recognized as a player with immense potential and was selected to join Westfields Sports High School.

Central Coast Mariners
In 2009, he was signed by the Central Coast Mariners to join their youth team in the A League competition. In 2009, he received the Golden Boot Award in the National Youth League and was quickly promoted to the senior team, where he made his debut on 12 February 2010, in their round 27 clash against Wellington Phoenix at Westpac Stadium in Wellington. Ibini-Isei made his starting debut for the Mariners against the Gold Coast and scored in a 3–1 win. After just his third start for the Central Coast Mariners Ibini-Isei scored the second goal for the Central Coast Mariners against Perth Glory. His speed and skill quickly gained the attention of the Australian under 20 National Team coach to play a key role in the U20 World Cup.

His consistent development and performances earned Bernie a two-year contract extension with the club, and on 1 February 2012 it was announced that he had signed a two-year contract extension with Central Coast Mariners.

Shanghai East Asia
On 4 June 2013, after his superb performances in the 2012/2013 Asian Champions League round of 16 clash against Guangzhou Evergrande, Central Coast Mariners received a record bid for Ibini from Shanghai East Asia FC who were keen to add to their squad list for the Chinese Super League. Three days later his move to newly promoted Chinese Super League side Shanghai East Asia, was complete with Ibini signing a three-year contract. This move made Ibini one of the most expensive under 21 players 21 in Asia. Bernie made an immediate impact in the Chinese Super League with his speed and skill playing as a wide striker. However, in November 2013, due to the unexpected tragic death of his father Ibini gained permission to return to the Australian A League, and previous club Central Coast Mariners on loan on compassionate grounds. The loan move took effect on 8 January 2014 and was until 31 May 2014 after which he was then to return to Shanghai.

Loan to Sydney FC
In May 2014 Ibini signed for Sydney FC on loan, making his debut in round 1 of the A League season against Melbourne City. Ibini scored his first goal in the Sydney Derby in a 1–1 draw. In the last three rounds of the A league season Ibini scored three goals: a contender for goal of the season against Perth Glory, a lob over the goalkeeper against Newcastle United and a solo goal against Wellington Phoenix. Although Sydney wanted to keep Ibini, he was recalled by Shanghai on 3 June 2015 Ibini played in every A-League fixture for Sydney during the 2014–15 season.

Club Brugge
Following his release from Sydney, due to his contract ending on 1 May, Ibini missed out on playing against 2014–15 Premier League champions Chelsea in a friendly at ANZ Stadium. It was shortly announced thereafter that Ibini had gained permission from Shanghai East Asia to travel to Belgium for a medical with Club Brugge with Shanghai unlikely to retain him due to their foreign player quota already filled. He signed a three-year deal with the club on 5 June 2015. It was announced that Ibini would wear the number 11 shirt.

Second loan to Sydney FC
After being ruled out for the 2015–16 Belgian Pro League season due to a broken leg he suffered in his first training session with Club Brugge, it was announced on 21 July 2016 that Ibini would return to Sydney FC on a loan deal once again. He made his return from injury in an FFA Cup semi-final against Canberra Olympic on 19 October 2016, coming on as a second-half substitute and scoring a late goal in a 3–0 win.

Vancouver Whitecaps FC
On 9 May 2017, Ibini signed with Major League Soccer club Vancouver Whitecaps FC on a one-year deal with an option to make it a two-year deal. On 8 August 2018, the Whitecaps announced that they and Ibini-Isei had "mutually agreed to a contract termination" to allow him to sign with Emirates Club of the UAE Pro League.

Jeonbuk Hyundai
In January 2019 Ibini signed with Korean side Jeonbuk Hyundai Motors. He left Jeonbuk, and arranged a transfer to Esteghlal only for the contract to be rescinded after Ibini failed a medical clearance at the club.

International career
Ibini made his debut for the Australian U-20 team in 2011, coming on as a second-half substitute in a 1–0 win against Germany U-20.

On 7 March 2011, he was selected to represent the Australia Olympic football team in an Asian Olympic Qualifier match against Iraq.

On 10 October 2014, he made his debut for the Australian senior team, starting in a friendly match against the United Arab Emirates in preparation for the 2015 AFC Asian Cup.

Career statistics

Honours

Club
Central Coast Mariners:
A-League Premiership: 2011–12
A-League Championship: 2012–13

Sydney FC
A-League Premiership: 2016–17

Jeonbuk Hyundai Motors
K League 1: 2019

Individual
 Y-League Golden Boot: 2010–11
 A-League All Star: 2014

See also
List of Central Coast Mariners FC players
List of Sydney FC players

References

External links
 
 
 

1992 births
Living people
Australian soccer players
Australia youth international soccer players
Australia under-20 international soccer players
Australia international soccer players
Australian expatriate soccer players
Blacktown City FC players
Sydney FC players
Central Coast Mariners FC players
Shanghai Port F.C. players
Club Brugge KV players
Vancouver Whitecaps FC players
Emirates Club players
Jeonbuk Hyundai Motors players
Newcastle Jets FC players
Western Sydney Wanderers FC players
A-League Men players
Chinese Super League players
UAE Pro League players
K League 1 players
Australian expatriate sportspeople in China
Australian expatriate sportspeople in Belgium
Expatriate footballers in China
Expatriate footballers in Belgium
Expatriate soccer players in Canada
Expatriate footballers in the United Arab Emirates
Sportspeople from Port Harcourt
Nigerian emigrants to Australia
Association football wingers
Major League Soccer players
Australian expatriate sportspeople in Canada
Australian expatriate sportspeople in South Korea
Expatriate footballers in South Korea
Nigerian footballers
Soccer players from Sydney
People educated at Westfields Sports High School